Adrien Goñi Cariñanos (born 25 August 1988) is a Spanish footballer who plays for UDC Txantrea as an attacking midfielder.

Club career
Goñi was born in Pamplona, Navarre. Another product of Athletic Bilbao's prolific youth ranks, he made his debut for the first team in the dying stages of the 2008–09 campaign, starting in a 1–1 La Liga away draw against Sporting de Gijón on 3 May.

In late January 2011, after almost two full seasons being solely used by the reserves in the Segunda División B, scoring a total of nine goals, Goñi terminated his contract with the club and signed a three-year deal with Girona FC of Segunda División, with the Basques having an option to rebuy in the first two. He played his only match in the competition on 21 May, coming in as a late substitute in the 0–2 home loss to FC Barcelona B.

In the summer of 2011, after only one official game with the Catalans (nine minutes played), Goñi joined CF Sporting Mahonés of division three. In the following transfer window, as the Balearic Islands club folded, he moved to another team in that tier, Orihuela CF.

Goñi continued to change clubs regularly in the next years, spending the 2012–13 campaign with SD Amorebieta, two years at UD Logroñés and another with La Roda CF, always in the third division. In summer 2016, he returned to Amorebieta.

Personal life
Goñi's younger brother, Julen, is also a footballer, who trained as a youth at Athletic and played as a right winger. The brothers were teammates during their time with Bilbao Athletic, along with their cousin Iker Muniain; Julen later moved to Barakaldo CF, but departed when they were relegated and did not find another club at that level.

References

External links

1988 births
Living people
Spanish footballers
Footballers from Pamplona
Association football midfielders
La Liga players
Segunda División players
Segunda División B players
Tercera División players
Tercera Federación players
CD Basconia footballers
Bilbao Athletic footballers
Athletic Bilbao footballers
Girona FC players
CF Sporting Mahonés players
Orihuela CF players
SD Amorebieta footballers
UD Logroñés players
La Roda CF players
CD Calahorra players
Racing Rioja CF players